Journal of the Neurological Sciences is a peer-reviewed medical journal covering the field of neurology. It is also the official journal of the World Federation of Neurology. According to the Journal Citation Reports, it received an impact factor of 4.453.

Sources

External links 
 

Neurology journals
Elsevier academic journals
Publications established in 1964
Monthly journals